Monobe is the part of Ninomiya, Tochigi which lies to farthest to the East. It is surrounded by mountains to the East and rice fields and strawberry farms to the West.
There is a museum dedicated to the eighteenth-century hero Ninomiya Sontoku in Monobe.

Geography of Tochigi Prefecture